Cătălin Ionuț Măgureanu (born 5 June 2000) is a Romanian professional footballer who plays as an attacking midfielder for Liga III side Înainte Modelu.

He came close to sign for Napoli in 2016, but his parents decided to keep him at Dinamo București. In September 2020, he signed a new contract with Dinamo.

Career statistics

Club

References

External links
 
 

2000 births
Living people
Footballers from Bucharest
Romanian footballers
Association football forwards
Liga I players
FC Dinamo București players
Liga II players
FC Dunărea Călărași players
CS Afumați players
Liga III players